The Wild Weißeritz is a river in the Czech Republic and in the German state of Saxony which drains the eastern Ore Mountains. It is the longest tributary of the Weißeritz.

The valley of the Wild Weißeritz is almost free of settlements. The Wild Weißeritz runs through Tharandt just some kilometres before it forms the Weißeritz together with the tributary Red Weißeritz in Freital.

The river feeds two water reservoirs for drinking water abstraction ( and ).

See also
 List of rivers of Saxony
List of rivers of the Czech Republic

Rivers of Saxony
Rivers of the Ústí nad Labem Region
International rivers of Europe
Rivers of Germany